The Treason Act 1553 (1 Mary Sess 1 c 1) was an Act of the Parliament of England. (It should not be confused with another Act about treason passed in the same year, 1 Mary Sess 2 c 6.)

The Act abolished all forms of treason that had been created since 1351, except the Treason Act 1351 itself. It also abolished all felonies created since the beginning of the reign of Henry VIII.

Repeal
Section 2 of this Act was repealed on 28 July 1863 by section 1 of, and the Schedule to, the Statute Law Revision Act 1863.

The rest of the Act was repealed by section 10(2) of, and Part I of Schedule 3 to, the Criminal Law Act 1967.

Other treason legislation
Another Act (1 Mary Sess.2 c.6) passed in the same year made it high treason to counterfeit foreign coins, or forge the Queen's privy seal, signet ring or royal sign manual. This Act was replaced by the Forgery Act 1830, which continued this form of treason until it was repealed in 1861. (That offence continued to exist as a felony until 1981.)

See also
High treason in the United Kingdom
Treason Act

References

External links
 The Treason Act 1553, Danby Pickering, The Statutes at Large, 1763, vol. 6, pp. 1 – 3 (from Google Book Search)

Acts of the Parliament of England (1485–1603)
1553 in law
Treason in England
1553 in England